87 Hits Out was a various artists "hits" collection album released in Australia in 1987 on the Starcall/ BMG-RCA record Label. The album spent 1 week at the top of the Australian album charts in 1987.

Track listing

Charts

References

1987 compilation albums
Pop compilation albums
RCA Records compilation albums
Rock compilation albums